Silchar railway station  is a railway station situated at Tarapur, Silchar in Assam. The railway station falls under the jurisdiction of the Northeast Frontier Railway zone of the Indian Railways. The railway gauge functioned here is broad gauge. The station consists of single diesel line". It is one of the oldest railway station in India built under Assam Bengal Railway. The station has three platforms with a total of 14 originating trains. It serves Silchar, as well as the whole Barak Valley. Trains operate to different cities of India from Silchar including Delhi, Kolkata, Chennai, Visakhapatnam, Kanpur, Patna, Prayagraj, Coimbatore, Vijayawada, Guwahati, Bhubaneswar, Thiruvananthapuram & Agartala. As of now, 170 stations across India are directly connected to Silchar railway station.

History 
The Station was first inaugurated in 1898 under Assam Bengal Railway. Assam Bengal Railway was incorporated in 1892 to serve British-owned tea plantations in Assam. Assam Bengal Railway had III sections & Silchar railway station come under Section I named as Comilla–Akhaura–Kulaura–Badarpur section opened in 1896–1898 and finally extended to Lumding in 1903.

Significance 

Silchar railway station was the location of one of the uprisings in support of the Bengali language. When the Assam government, under Chief Minister Bimala Prasad Chaliha, passed a circular to make Assamese mandatory, Bengalis of Barak Valley protested. On 19 May 1961, Assam police opened fire on unarmed demonstrators at Silchar railway station. Eleven protesters were killed.

After the popular revolt, the Assam government had to withdraw the circular and Bengali was ultimately given official status in the three districts of Barak Valley.

Every year on 19 May is celebrated as Bhasha Shahid Divas to commemorate the incident.

Amenities 
The station contains three platforms serving several passengers. It contains retiring rooms or passenger waiting rooms with proper sanitation facilities. The Station is upgraded with reservation facilities through ticket counters in the year 1995. It is also upgraded with RailTel free WiFi facilities. The station is also upgraded with a Digital Museum Video Wall on the entrance of the station that will showcase the rich heritage of Indian Railways and other information related to rail travellers

Incidents
On 19 May 1961, during the Bengali Language Movement of Barak Valley, Assam Police opened fire on unarmed demonstrators at Silchar railway station in which 11 protesters were killed. After which Bengali language was ultimately given official status in Barak Valley

On 9 June 2019, three coaches of Silchar–Trivandram Express caught fire in the early hours of Sunday, while it was stationed at Silchar railway station. No casualties recorded later

Security
In 2020, High definition CCTV cameras were installed at platforms, circulating and waiting areas of Silchar railway station by Northeast Frontier Railway (NFR) under ISS (integrated security system) to ensure round-the-clock security to passengers, especially women

Major trains
Silchar–New Delhi Poorvottar Sampark Kranti Express
Thiruvananthapuram–Silchar Aronai Superfast Express
Silchar-Coimbatore Superfast Express
Sealdah–Silchar Kanchanjunga Express
Barak–Brahmaputra Express
Guwahati–Silchar Express

Gallery

See also 
 Assam Bengal Railway
 Silchar (Lok Sabha constituency)
 Silchar (Vidhan Sabha constituency)

References

External links

NFR official website

Railway stations in Cachar district
Lumding railway division
Transport in Silchar